BIDARAHALLI(ಬಿದರಹಳ್ಳಿ)  is a Hobali Headquarter in Bangalore East Taluk in Bengaluru Urban district Pin Code 560049 in the southern state of Karnataka, India.

References

Headquarters in India